USKOK is a body of the Croatian criminal justice system. USKOK is attached to the State's Attorney Office and specializes in investigations related to corruption and organized crime.

USKOK was formed in December 2001 and its headquarters are located in Zagreb. The bureau's name is a bacronym from "uskok", a term used for a type of Croatian militia men, who had fought against the Ottoman Empire between the early 16th and 17th century.

In December 2008 the Criminal Code and the Criminal Procedure Act were revised to strengthen USKOK. The revisions increased the tools available to authorities to fight corruption, specifically the possibility for seizing and forfeiting assets. The revisions subsequently led both to a rise in the number of high level corruption prosecutions and the speed at which they are processed and completed.

Since 2009, USKOK has a counterpart in the Criminal Police Directorate (governing the Croatian Police) which has an (intentionally) very similar name - the National Police USKOK, as well as in the judiciary - the Court Departments for Criminal Cases in the Jurisdiction of USKOK. Described as "one of the world's most formidable anti-corruption outfits", the agency has prosecuted 2,000 individuals and achieved a 95% conviction rate (2012), including former Prime Minister Ivo Sanader.

In its 2014 EU Anti-Corruption report, the European Commission commended USKOK's ability to "carry out impartial investigations into allegations of corruption irrespective of the political affiliation or connections of those involved". But in a subsequent report in 2017, the EC noted enduring problems concerning inter-institutional coordination, and called the overall effectiveness of the institutional framework into question.

References

External links
 Official website 

2001 establishments in Croatia
Anti-corruption agencies
Law enforcement in Croatia
Organized crime in Croatia